Shelley Preston (born 14 May 1964) is a singer who is famous for being a former member of the pop group Bucks Fizz, when she replaced Jay Aston in June 1985. Her biggest hit as a member of the band was the 1986 track "New Beginning", which reached the UK top ten. She left the group in 1990. From 2004 to 2009, she was a member of the group The Original Bucks Fizz, along with former Bucks Fizz members Cheryl Baker and Mike Nolan.

Career 
Preston was born in Hillingdon, England. She started singing in her local Sunday school choir from 4 years of age. While she was still at school, she sang with the Bournemouth Operatic Society. She worked as a singer at a hotel nightclub in Sri Lanka for six months before being selected at a London audition to be the new member of Bucks Fizz.

Shelley was introduced as the new member of Bucks Fizz to millions of viewers on the BBC TV prime-time chat show Wogan, hosted by Terry Wogan.

After the highly publicised introduction of Shelley to Bucks Fizz, her first single release with the group, ‘Magical’, reached number 57 in the UK in the Autumn of 1985. They returned to the UK top 10 when "New Beginning (Mamba Seyra)" was released in May 1986, reaching number 8. With its lavish production, multi layered vocals and heavy drum sound, it was well received by critics and popular on the radio. Although the follow up singles did not reach the UK top 40, the group continued to remain popular with their concert tour audiences. The singles were all on the album Writing on the Wall(UK no. 89), which also included the original version of ‘Love In A World Gone Mad’, intended for a single release early 1987 (a performance of this song was filmed for The Little & Large Show), however the single was subsequently cancelled. A re-recorded version featuring both Shelley and Cheryl Baker on lead verses surfaced on the 2004 re-release of the ‘Writing On The Wall’ album.

After leaving Bucks Fizz in 1991, Preston made a career as a backing vocalist, touring and appearing with Jason Donovan, INXS, Brian May, Alannah Myles, Michael Bolton, Go West, Beverley Craven, Alexander O'Neal, Luther Vandross, Donny Osmond, Blue, Westlife, Alison Moyet, Tom Jones, David Hasselhoff, Errol Brown, Belinda Carlisle. During the 1990s she worked as a model, appearing in a number of commercials. She was also the voice of Radio One as featured vocalist on their idents for two years.

In 2001 she was invited to join the "chillout lounge" band Cloudfish, with Spandau Ballet saxophonist, Steve Norman. Together they wrote and produced their own material and released an EP in July 2006. They performed at the legendary Ronnie Scott's Jazz Club in Soho, London, and have played at Pacha in Ibiza.

In 2004, Preston reunited with Bucks Fizz bandmates Cheryl Baker, Mike Nolan and Bobby G for the Christmas Here & Now arena tour. Following this, Baker, Nolan and Preston decided to continue as The Original Bucks Fizz. As a three-piece they performed at various festivals, nightclubs, and toured theatres up and down the UK. In June 2008, they performed at the last G-A-Y night alongside McFly and The Feeling. In August 2008, Preston with Baker, Nolan and Aston took part in a makeover show for Living TV, which was aired in March 2009 and performed with Björn Again at the Hammersmith Apollo on 18 December 2008.

In April 2009, Preston left The Original Bucks Fizz and was replaced by the original Bucks Fizz band member, Jay Aston.

Since leaving The Original Bucks Fizz, Shelley has occasionally performed at intimate venues, including the Colour House Theatre, London.

Personal life 
Shelley and INXS bassist Garry Gary Beers had a short relationship in the late 1990s.  They share a son named Benjamin Preston-Beers. 

Shelley's marriage to Steve Norman ended after more than thirteen years when they divorced in 2015.  Shelley has performed Cloudfish songs at her occasional solo gigs.

Discography 
With Bucks Fizz:

Singles 

September 1985 "Magical"
June 1986 "New Beginning (Mamba Seyra)"
August 1986 "Love the One You're With"
November 1986 "Keep Each Other Warm"
October 1988 "Heart of Stone"
May 1989 "You Love Love"

Albums 

November 1986 Writing on the Wall
November 1988 The Story So Far
July 2005 The Ultimate Anthology
August 2006 The Lost Masters
May 2008 The Lost Masters 2: The Final Cut

References

External links 
The Official Shelley Preston Facebook page
Shelley Preston Official Site
The Official Cloudfish Facebook page
Bucks Fizz The Early Years
Garry Gary Beers

1964 births
Living people
People from Hillingdon
Preston, Shelley